All Good Things is a BBC's six-part comedy-drama series  that aired on BBC1 from 14 May to 18 June 1991, starring Brenda Blethyn and Warren Clarke.

Episodes
"The Blessing" (14 May 1991)
"The Suicide" (21 May 1991)
"Reading Lessons" (28 May 1991)
"The Flat" (4 June 1991)
"The Trip North" (11 June 1991)
"Marriage Guidance" (18 June 1991)

Cast and characters

Media releases
The complete series of All Good Things on DVD in a 2-disc set was released by Simply Media on 28 November 2016.

References

External links
 
 British Comedy Guide entry on All Good Things

1991 British television series debuts
1991 British television series endings
1990s British comedy-drama television series
BBC comedy-drama television shows
British comedy-drama television shows
1990s British television miniseries
English-language television shows
Television shows set in England